This article lists events that occurred during 1950 in Estonia.

Incumbents
Nikolai Karotamm

Events
March – Estonian Communist Party was gone under Moscow control. Many intellectuals were fired and replaced by "leading workers". These "leading workers" were imported from USSR.
1 October – administrative reform: counties were replaced by rural rayons.

Births
31 July – Olav Ehala, composer

Deaths

References

 
1950s in Estonia
Estonia
Estonia
Years of the 20th century in Estonia